Chena  may refer to:
 Chena (root), an Indian food
 Chena, Alaska
 Chena Hot Springs, Alaska
 Chena River, Alaska
 Chena, Ethiopia, a woreda or administrative government unit
 Huaca de Chena, sacred Inca place near Santiago de Chile
 Tropical forest or woodland subject to shifting cultivation
Chenna massacre, civilian deaths during the Tigray War in Ethiopia in 2021
Chhena, cheese curds on the Indian subcontinent
Chena Black, Miss Continental 1983